Booz is a surname. Notable people with the surname include:

Edmund Booz (c. 1824–1870), a Philadelphia distiller whose bottles had a distinctive log-cabin shape
Edwin G. Booz (1887-1951), American businessman 
Ludovic Booz (born 1940), Haitian artist

See Also
Booze (surname)